West Country English is a group of English language varieties and accents used by much of the native population of South West England, the area sometimes popularly known as the West Country.

The West Country is often defined as encompassing the counties of Cornwall, Devon, Dorset, Somerset, Wiltshire, the City of Bristol, and Gloucestershire. However, the northern and eastern boundaries of the area are hard to define. In the adjacent counties of Herefordshire, Worcestershire, Hampshire, Berkshire and Oxfordshire it is possible to encounter similar accents and, indeed, much the same distinct dialect but with some similarities to others in neighbouring regions. Although natives of such locations, especially in rural parts, can still have West Country influences in their speech, the increased mobility and urbanisation of the population has meant that in the more populous of those counties the dialect itself, as opposed to various local accents, is becoming increasingly rare.

Academically the regional variations are considered to be dialectal forms. The Survey of English Dialects captured manners of speech across the South West region that were just as different from Standard English as any from the far North of England. There is some influence from the Welsh and Cornish languages depending on the specific location.

In literature, film and TV
In literary contexts, most of the usage has been in either poetry or dialogue, to add "local colour". It has rarely been used for serious prose in recent times, but was used much more extensively up until the 19th century. West Country dialects are commonly represented as "Mummerset", a kind of catchall southern rural accent invented for broadcasting.

Early period
 The Late West Saxon dialect was the standard literary language of later Anglo-Saxon England, and consequently the majority of Anglo-Saxon literature, including the epic poem Beowulf and the poetic Biblical paraphrase Judith, is preserved in West Saxon dialect, though not all of it was originally written in West Saxon.
 In the medieval period Sumer is icumen in (13th century) is a notable example of a work in the dialect.
 The Cornish language (and Breton) descended from the ancient British language (Brythonic/Brittonic) that was spoken all over what is now the West Country until the West Saxons conquered and settled most of the area. The Cornish language throughout much of the High Middle Ages was not just the vernacular but the prestigious language in Cornwall among all classes, but was also spoken in large areas of Devon well after the Norman conquest. Cornish began to decline after the Late Middle Ages with English expanding westwards, and after the Prayer Book Rebellion, suffered terminal decline, dying out in the 18th century. (Its existence today is a revival).

17th century
 In King Lear, Edgar speaks in the West Country dialect, as one of his various personae.
 Both Sir Francis Drake and Sir Walter Raleigh were noted at the Court of Queen Elizabeth for their strong Devon accents.

18th century
 Tom Jones (1749) by Henry Fielding, set in Somerset, again mainly dialogue. Considered one of the first true English novels.

19th century
 William Barnes' Dorset dialect poetry (1801–1886).
Walter Hawken Tregellas (1831–1894), author of many stories written in the local dialect of the county of Cornwall and a number of other works.
 Anthony Trollope's (1815–1882) series of books Chronicles of Barsetshire (1855–1867) also use some in dialogue.
 The novels of Thomas Hardy (1840–1928) often use the dialect in dialogue, notably Tess of the D'Urbervilles (1891).
 Wiltshire Rhymes and Tales in the Wiltshire Dialect (1894) and other works by Edward Slow.
 The Gilbert and Sullivan operetta The Sorcerer is set in the fictional village of Ploverleigh in Somerset. Some dialogue and song lyrics, especially for the chorus, are a phonetic approximation of West Country speech. The Pirates of Penzance is set in Devon and Ruddigore is set in Cornwall.
 John Davey a farmer from Zennor, records the native Cornish language Cranken Rhyme.
 R. D. Blackmore's Lorna Doone. According to Blackmore, he relied on a "phonogogic" style for his characters' speech, emphasizing their accents and word formation. He expended great effort, in all of his novels, on his characters' dialogues and dialects, striving to recount realistically not only the ways, but also the tones and accents, in which thoughts and utterances were formed by the various sorts of people who lived in the Exmoor district.

20th century
 'Zummerzet speech' is discussed in The Somerset Coast (1909) by Charles George Harper.
 Songs of the Soil by Percy G Stone, verse in Isle of Wight dialect, rendered phonetically, showing similarities with 'core' West Country dialects. 
 A Glastonbury Romance (1933) by John Cowper Powys (1872–1963) contains dialogue written in imitation of the local Somerset dialect.
 Albert John Coles, (1876–1965), writing as Jan Stewer, wrote 3,000 short stories in the Devonshire dialect for local Devon newspapers, and published collections of them, as well as performing them widely on stage, film, and broadcast.
 Laurie Lee's (1914–1997) works such as Cider with Rosie (1959) portray a somewhat idealised Gloucestershire childhood in the Five Valleys area.
 John Fowles's Daniel Martin, which features the title character's girlfriend's dialect.
 Dennis Potter's Blue Remembered Hills is a television play about children in the Forest of Dean during the Second World War. The dialogue is written in the style of the Forest dialect.
The songs of Adge Cutler (from Nailsea, died 1974) were famous for their West Country dialect, sung in a strong Somerset accent. His legacy lives on in the present day Wurzels and other so-called "Scrumpy and Western" artists.
The folk group The Yetties perform songs composed in the dialect of Dorset (they originate from Yetminster).
Andy Partridge, lead singer with the group XTC, has a pronounced Wiltshire accent. Although more noticeable in his speech, his accent may also be heard in some of his singing.
 J. K. Rowling's Harry Potter fantasy novels feature Hagrid, a character who has a West Country accent.
 Berk, the central monster character from The Trap Door, voiced by actor and comedian Willie Rushton.
 Archaeologist Phil Harding from Channel 4's Time Team speaks with a strong Wiltshire accent.

History and origins
Until the 19th century, the West Country and its dialects were largely protected from outside influences, due to its relative geographical isolation. While standard English derives from the Old English Mercian dialects, the West Country dialects derive from the West Saxon dialect, which formed the earliest English language standard. Thomas Spencer Baynes claimed in 1856 that, due to its position at the heart of the Kingdom of Wessex, the relics of Anglo-Saxon accent, idiom and vocabulary were best preserved in the Somerset dialect.

The dialects have their origins in the expansion of Anglo-Saxon into the west of modern-day England, where the kingdom of Wessex (West-Saxons) had been founded in the 6th century. As the Kings of Wessex became more powerful they enlarged their kingdom westwards and north-westwards by taking territory from the British kingdoms in those districts. From Wessex, the Anglo-Saxons spread into the Celtic regions of present-day Devon, Somerset and Gloucestershire, bringing their language with them. At a later period Cornwall came under Wessex influence, which appears to become more extensive after the time of Athelstan in the 10th century. However the spread of the English language took much longer here than elsewhere.

Outside Cornwall, it is believed that the various local dialects reflect the territories of various West Saxon tribes, who had their own dialects
which fused together into a national language in the later Anglo-Saxon period.

As Lt-Col. J. A. Garton observed in 1971, traditional Somerset English has a venerable and respectable origin, and is not a mere "debasement" of Standard English:

In some cases, many of these forms are closer to modern Saxon (commonly called Low German/Low Saxon) than Standard British English is, e.g.

The use of masculine and sometimes feminine, rather than neuter, pronouns with non-animate referents also parallels Low German, which unlike English retains grammatical genders. The pronunciation of "s" as "z" is also similar to Low German. However, recent research proposes that some syntactical features of English, including the unique forms of the verb to be, originate rather with the Brythonic languages. (See Celtic language influence below.)

In more recent times, West Country dialects have been treated with some derision, which has led many local speakers to abandon them or water them down. In particular it is British comedy which has brought them to the fore outside their native regions, and paradoxically groups such as The Wurzels, a comic North Somerset/Bristol band from whom the term Scrumpy and Western music originated, have both popularised and made fun of them simultaneously. In an unusual regional breakout, the Wurzels' song "The Combine Harvester" reached the top of the UK charts in 1976, where it did nothing to dispel the "simple farmer" stereotype of Somerset and West Country folk. It and all their songs are sung entirely in a local version of the dialect, which is somewhat exaggerated and distorted. Some words used aren't even typical of the local dialect. For instance, the word "nowt" is used in the song "Threshing Machine". This word is generally used in more northern parts of England, with the West Country equivalent being "nawt".

Celtic language influence

Although the English language gradually spread into Cornwall after approximately the 13th century, a complete language shift to English took centuries more. The linguistic boundary, between English in the east and Cornish in the west, shifted markedly in the county between 1300 and 1750 (see figure). This is not to be thought of as a sharp boundary and it should not be inferred that there were no Cornish speakers to the east of a line, and no English speakers to the west. Nor should it be inferred that the boundary suddenly moved a great distance every 50 years.

During the Prayer Book Rebellion of 1549, which centred on Devon and Cornwall, many of the Cornish objected to the Book of Common Prayer, on the basis that many Cornish could not speak English. Cornish probably ceased to be spoken as a community language sometime around 1780, with the last monoglot Cornish speaker believed to be Chesten Marchant, who died in 1676 at Gwithian (Dolly Pentreath was bilingual). However, some people retained a fragmented knowledge and some words were adopted by dialect(s) in Cornwall.

In recent years, the traffic has reversed, with the revived Cornish language reclaiming Cornish words that had been preserved in the local dialect into its lexicon, and also (especially "Revived Late Cornish") borrowing other dialect words. However, there has been some controversy over whether all of these words are of native origin, as opposed to imported from parts of England, or the Welsh Marches. Some modern day revived Cornish speakers have been known to use Cornish words within an English sentence, and even those who are not speakers of the language sometimes use words from the language in names.

Brythonic languages have also had a long-term influence on the West Country dialects beyond Cornwall, both as a substrate (certain West Country dialect words and possibly grammatical features) and languages of contact. Recent research on the roots of English proposes that the extent of Brythonic syntactic influence on Old English and Middle English may have been underestimated, and specifically cites the preponderance of the forms of the verbs to be and to do in the southwestern region and their grammatical similarity to Welsh and Cornish in opposition to the Germanic languages.

Bos: Cornish verb to be

The Cornish dialect, or Anglo-Cornish (to avoid confusion with the Cornish language), has the most substantial Celtic language influence, because many western parts were non-English speaking even into the early modern period. In places such as Mousehole, Newlyn and St Ives, fragments of Cornish survived in English even into the 20th century, e.g. some numerals (especially for counting fish) and the Lord's Prayer were noted by W. D. Watson in 1925, Edwin Norris collected the Creed in 1860, and J. H. Nankivel also recorded numerals in 1865. The dialect of West Penwith is particularly distinctive, especially in terms of grammar. This is most likely due to the late decay of the Cornish language in this area. In Cornwall the following places were included in the Survey of English Dialects: Altarnun, Egloshayle, Gwinear, Kilkhampton, Mullion, St Buryan, and St Ewe.

In other areas, Celtic vocabulary is less common, but it is notable that "coombe", cognate with Welsh cwm, was borrowed from Brythonic into Old English and is common in placenames east of the Tamar, especially Devon, and also in northern Somerset around Bath and the examples Hazeley Combe and Combley Great Wood (despite spelling difference, both are pronounced 'coombe') are to be found as far away as the Isle of Wight. Some possible examples of Brythonic words surviving in Devon dialect include:
 Goco — A bluebell
 Jonnick — Pleasant, agreeable

Characteristics

Phonology
 West Country accents are rhotic like most Canadian, American, Irish and Scottish accents, meaning that the historical loss of non-syllable-final /r/ did not take place, in contrast to non-rhotic accents like Received Pronunciation. Often, this  is specifically realised as the retroflex approximant , which is typically lengthened at the ends of words. Rhoticity appears to be declining in both real and apparent time in some areas of the West Country, for example Dorset.
 , as in trap or cat, is often open , the more open variant fairly common in urban areas but especially common in rural areas.
 The  split associated with London English may not exist for some speakers, or may exist marginally on the basis of simply a length difference. Short vowels have also been reported, e.g., .
 h-dropping: initial  can often be omitted so "hair" and "air" become homophones. This is common in working-class speech in most parts of England.
 The Survey of English Dialects found that Cornwall retained some older features of speech that are now considered "Northern" in England. For example, a close  in suck, but, cup, etc. and sometimes a short  in words such as aunt.
 Initial fricative consonants can be voiced, particularly in more traditional and older speakers, so that "s" is pronounced as Standard English "z" and "f" as Standard English "v". This feature is now exceedingly rare.
 In words containing "r" before a vowel, there is frequent metathesis – "gurt" (great), "Burdgwater" (Bridgwater) and "chillurn" (children)
 In many words with the letter "l" near the end, such as gold or cold, the "l" is often not pronounced, so "an old gold bowl" would sound like "an ode goad bow".
 In Bristol, a terminal "a" can be realised as the sound  – e.g. cinema as "cinemaw" and America as "Americaw" – which is often perceived by non-Bristolians to be an intrusive "l". Hence the old joke about the three Bristolian sisters Evil, Idle and Normali.e.: Eva, Ida, and Norma. The name Bristol itself (originally Bridgestowe or Bristow) is believed to have originated from this local pronunciation.

Vocabulary

 Some of the vocabulary used relates to English words of a bygone era, e.g. the verb "to hark" (as in "'ark a'ee"), "thee" (often abbreviated to "'ee"), the increased use of the infinitive form of the verb "to be" etc.

Some of these terms are obsolete, but some are in current use.

Some dialect words now appear mainly, or solely, in place names, such as "batch" (North Somerset, = hill but more commonly applied to Coalmine spoil heaps e.g. Camerton batch, Farrington batch, Braysdown batch), "tyning", "hoe" (a bay). These are not to be confused with fossilised Brythonic or Cornish language terms; for example, "-coombe" is quite a common suffix in West Country place names (not so much in Cornwall), and means "valley".

Grammar
 The second person singular thee (or ye) and thou forms used, thee often contracted to 'ee.
 Bist may be used instead of are for the second person, e.g.: how bist? ("how are you?") This has its origins in the Old English – or Anglo-Saxon – language; compare the modern German  (a literal translation of "How are you?", not used as a greeting).
 Use of masculine (rather than neuter) pronouns with non-animate referents, e.g.: put'ee over there ("put it over there") and e's a nice scarf ("That's a nice scarf").
 An a- prefix may be used to denote the past participle; a-went ("gone").
 Use of they in conjunction with plural nouns, where Standard English demands those e.g.: They shoes are mine ("Those shoes are mine" / "They are mine"). This is also used in Modern Scots but differentiated thae meaning those and thay the plural of he, she and it, both from the Anglo-Saxon þā 'they/those', the plural form of  'he/that',  'she/that' and þæt 'it/that'.
 In other areas, be may be used exclusively in the present tense, often in the present continuous; Where you be going to? ("Where are you going?")
 The use of to to denote location. Where's that to? ("Where's that [at]?"). This is something that can still be heard often, unlike many other characteristics. This former usage is common to Newfoundland English, where many of the island's modern-day descendants have West Country origins — particularly Bristol — as a result of the 17th–19th century migratory fishery.
Use of the past tense writ where Standard English uses wrote. e.g.: I writ a letter ("I wrote a letter").
Nominative pronouns as indirect objects. For instance, Don't tell I, tell'ee! ("Don't tell me, tell him!"), "'ey give I fifty quid and I zay no, giv'ee to charity inztead" ("They gave me £50 and I said no, give it to charity instead"). When in casual Standard English the oblique case is used, in the West Country dialect the object of many a verb takes the nominative case.

Social stigma and future of the dialect
Owing to the West Country's agricultural history, the West Country accent has for centuries been associated with farming, and consequently with a lack of education and rustic simplicity. This can be seen in literature as early as the 18th century, for instance in Richard Brinsley Sheridan's play The Rivals, set in the Somerset city of Bath.

As more and more of the English population moved into towns and cities during the 20th century, non-regional, Standard English accents increasingly became a marker of personal social mobility. Universal primary education was also an important factor as it made it possible for some to move out of their rural environments into situations where other modes of speech were current.

A West Country accent continues to be a reason for denigration and stereotype:

In the early part of the twentieth century, the journalist and writer Albert John Coles used the pseudonym Jan Stewer (a character from the folk song Widecombe Fair) to pen a long-running series of humorous articles and correspondences in Devon dialect for the Western Morning News. These now preserve a record of the dialect as recalled with affection in the period. The tales perpetuate – albeit sympathetically – the rustic uneducated stereotype as the protagonist experiences the modern world.

There is a popular prejudice that stereotypes speakers as unsophisticated and even backward, due possibly to the deliberate and lengthened nature of the accent. This can work to the West Country speaker's advantage, however: recent studies of how trustworthy Britons find their fellows based on their regional accents put the West Country accent high up, under southern Scottish English but a long way above Cockney and Scouse. Recent polls put the West Country accent as third and fifth most attractive in the British Isles respectively.

The West Country accent is probably most identified in film as "pirate speech"cartoon-like "Ooh arr, me 'earties! Sploice the mainbrace!" talk is very similar to West Country speech. This may be a result of the strong seafaring and fisherman tradition of the West Country, both legal and outlaw. Edward Teach (Blackbeard) was a native of Bristol, and privateer and English hero Sir Francis Drake hailed from Tavistock in Devon. Gilbert and Sullivan's operetta The Pirates of Penzance may also have added to the association. West Country native Robert Newton's performance in the 1950 Disney film Treasure Island is credited with popularizing the stereotypical West Country "pirate voice". Newton's strong West Country accent also featured in Blackbeard the Pirate (1952).

See also
Cornish language
History of the English language
International Talk Like a Pirate Day
Janner
Jan Stewer
Late West Saxon
List of Cornish dialect words
Mummerset
Newfoundland English
South West England

References

Further reading
 M. A. Courtney; T. Q. Couch: Glossary of Words in Use in Cornwall. West Cornwall, by M. A. Courtney; East Cornwall, by T. Q. Couch. London: published for the English Dialect Society, by Trübner & Co., 1880
 John Kjederqvist: "The Dialect of Pewsey (Wiltshire)", Transactions of the Philological Society 1903–1906
 Etsko Kruisinga: A Grammar of the Dialect of West Somerset, Bonn, 1905
 Clement Marten: The Devonshire Dialect, Exeter, 1974
 Clement Marten: Flibberts and Skriddicks: Stories and Poems in the Devon Dialect, Exeter, 1983
 Mrs. Palmer: A Devonshire Dialogue In Four Parts. To Which is added a Glossary for the most part by the late Rev. John Phillips. Edited by Mrs. Gwatkin. London and Plymouth, 1839. 
 "A Lady": Mary Palmer: A Dialogue in the Devonshire Dialect (in three parts) by A Lady to which is added a Glossary by J. F. Palmer, London & Exeter, 1837
 Norman Rogers: Wessex Dialect, Bradford-on-Avon, 1979
 Bertil Widén: Studies in the Dorset Dialect, Lund, 1949

External links
 Sounds Familiar?Listen to examples of regional accents and dialects from across the UK on the British Library's 'Sounds Familiar' website
 Bristol
Bristol Dialect/Glossary
 Cornwall
Cornish Dialect Dictionary
Cornish Provincial Words, by "Uncle Jan Trenoodle", 1845?
 Poetry from South West England, by "Les Merton", 2006
 Devon
A Devon Dialect Vocabulary
BBC Devon: Dialect (with pronunciation)
 Somerset

Somerset voices
Wadham Pigott Williams, A Glossary of Provincial Words & Phrases in use in Somersetshire'', Longmans, Green, Reader & Dyer, 1873
 Wessex
1902 Wessex Dialect Glossary
Dialect Syntax in the South West of England (pdf)

English language in England
Languages of the United Kingdom
English